Lycée Georges Clemenceau is a senior high school in Villemomble, Seine-Saint-Denis, France, in the Paris metropolitan area.

The school opened in 1946 as an annex of Lycée Charlemagne (now Lycée Albert Schweitzer) in Le Raincy. On 1 January 1961 it became its own high school.

References

External links
 Lycée Georges Clemenceau

Lycées in Seine-Saint-Denis
1946 establishments in France
Educational institutions established in 1946